The Monkey Puzzle is the eighteenth studio album by the British hard rock band UFO. It was released on 25 September 2006 in Europe and a day later in the United States.
It also marks the return of founding drummer Andy Parker to the band and the last to feature founding bassist Pete Way.

Track listing

Personnel

Band members
 Phil Mogg - vocals
 Vinnie Moore - guitars
 Paul Raymond - keyboards, backing vocals
 Pete Way - bass
 Andy Parker - drums

Production
 Tommy Newton - producer, engineer, mixing
 Tristan Greatrex – album artwork
 Kai Swillus - photography

References

UFO (band) albums
2006 albums
SPV/Steamhammer albums